Ylva is a  sailboat class designed by Steen Kjølhede and built in about 100 copies.

History
Dinghy builder Steen Kjølhede built the first wooden Ylva in 1973 and won the 1973 Sjælland Rundt, an achievement he repeated three more times in a row with new-built Ylvas.

See also
BB 10 (keelboat)

References

1970s sailboat type designs
Sailboat type designs by Danish designers
Sailboat types built in Denmark
Keelboats